The 1962–63 Greek Football Cup was the 21st edition of the Greek Football Cup. The competition culminated with the Greek Cup Final, held at Leoforos Alexandras Stadium, Athens on 18 July 1963. The match was contested by Olympiacos and Pierikos, with Olympiacos winning by 3–0.

Calendar
From Round of 32 onwards:

Knockout phase
In the knockout phase, teams play against each other over a single match. If the match ends up as a draw, extra time will be played and if the match remains a draw a replay match is set at the home of the guest team which the extra time rule stands as well. If a winner doesn't occur after the replay match the winner emerges by a flip of a coin.The mechanism of the draws for each round is as follows:
In the draw for the round of 32, the teams that had qualified to previous' season Round of 16 are seeded and the clubs that passed the qualification round are unseeded.
In the draws for the round of 16 onwards, there are no seedings, and teams from the same group can be drawn against each other.

Bracket

Round of 32

||colspan="2" rowspan="13" 

||colspan="2" 
|}

Round of 16

||colspan="2" rowspan="6" 

|}

Quarter-finals

||colspan="2" rowspan="2" 

||colspan="2" 
|}

Semi-finals

||colspan="2" 
|}

Final

The 21st Greek Cup Final was played at the Leoforos Alexandras Stadium.

References

External links
Greek Cup 1962-63 at RSSSF

Greek Football Cup seasons
Greek Cup
Cup